Baggina is a genus of foraminifers in the order Rotaliida.

References 

Rotaliida genera